The Euro Currency Index (EUR_I) represents the arithmetic ratio of four major currencies against the Euro: the American dollar, British sterling, the Japanese yen and the Swiss franc. All ratios are expressed in units of currency per Euro. The index was launched in 2004 by the exchange portal Stooq.com. Underlying are 100 points on 4 January 1971. Before the introduction of the European single currency on 1 January 1999 an exchange rate of 1 euro = DM 1.95583 was calculated.

Based on the progression, the Euro Currency Index can show the strength or weakness of the euro. A rising index indicates an appreciation of the euro against the currencies in the currency basket, a falling index in contrast, a devaluation. Relationships to commodity indices are recognizable. A rising Euro Currency Index means a tendency of falling commodity prices. This is especially true for agricultural commodities and the price of oil. Even the prices of precious metals (gold and silver) are correlated with the index.

Arithmetically weighted Euro Currency Index is comparable to the trade-weighted euro Effective exchange rate index of the European Central Bank (ECB). The index of ECB measures much more accurately the value of the Euro, compared to the Euro Currency Index, since the competitiveness of European goods in comparison to other countries and trading partners is included in it.

Former Euro Currency Indexes

Dow Jones & Company 
On September 13, 2005 Dow Jones & Company published two versions of the index, the Dow Jones Euro Currency Index (DJEURO) and the Dow Jones Euro Currency 5 Index (DJEURO5). Underlying of each were 100 points on 31 December 1998.

Dow Jones Euro Currency Index: Index measured the changes in value of the euro against 10 currencies: the US dollar, the yen, sterling, the Swiss Franc, the rouble, the Swedish krona, the won, the Canadian dollar, the New Taiwan dollar and the Australian dollar. 
Dow Jones Euro Currency 5 Index: It was a key figure, which compared the value of the Euro by a basket of currencies of five of the world's most liquid currencies: the US dollar, the Japanese yen, Sterling, the Swiss franc and Australian dollar.

The calculation of the Dow Jones Euro Currency 5 Index was set on 29 August 2008 (last value 121.97 points)  and the calculation of the Dow Jones Euro Currency Index on 9 January 2009 (last value 119.41 points).

New York Board of Trade 
The Euro Currency Index (ECX, also EURX or EXY) was launched on 13 January 2006 by the New York Board of Trade (NYBOT) and calculated back to 2001. In 2007, the IntercontinentalExchange (ICE) based in Atlanta (USA) changed the name of the stock exchange in IntercontinentalExchange 
The index was a ratio that compared the value of the euro by a currency basket of five currencies: US dollar (31.55 percent), sterling (30.56 percent), yen (18.91 percent), Swiss franc (11.13 percent) and the Swedish krona (7.85 percent).

The ECX was the geometrically weighted average compared to these currencies. The formula for the calculation was 34.38805726 multiplied by the product of all components in the basket of currencies, that have been raised to a high number of their percentage, weighting equal to:

ECX = 34.38805726 x (EURUSD^(0.3155) x EURGBP^(0.3056) x EURJPY^(0.1891) x EURCHF^(0.1113) x EURSEK^(0.0785)) 

The all-time low was constructed on 6 July 2001, with 83.36 points and the all-time high on July 14, 2008, 123.82 points. On 20 May 2011, the exchange ICE Futures U.S. ended the trading of futures and options on the index.
On July 28, 2011, the calculation of the ICE Euro Currency Index was discontinued (last value was 108.88 points).

Historical overview 
The Euro Currency Index started on 4 January 1971 with 100 points. Before the introduction of the European single currency on 1 January 1999, an exchange rate of 1 euro = DM 1.95583 was calculated.

On April 19, 1971, the Euro Currency Index gained 99.67 points calculated with an all-time low. Until 3 December 1979, the index rose by 68.0 percent to 167.43 points. With the depreciation of the D–Mark against the major currencies, the index fell to mid-1980s. On 3 May 1985, the Euro Currency Index was at level 122.26 points, up by 27.0 percent. The strength of the D–Mark against almost all global currencies set the index in the following years to rise again. On 5 October 1992, a value of 195.98 points was determined. The increase in 1985 was 60.3 percent. On 25 October 2000, the index closed at 130.83 points, up by 33.2 percent.

In 2000 began a multi-year upward movement of the euro. On 29 December 2008, the index marked 209.65 points, an all-time high. The profit since year 2000 is 60.2 percent. In the course of the international financial crisis, from which the U.S. real estate crisis originated in the summer of 2007, the index began to decline. On 6 February 2009 a value of 187.84 points was determined. In the following eight months, the European single currency rebounded from the lows. On 13 October 2009, the index rose by 208.45 points, near its historical high point.

A financial crisis in several member states of the Euro zone in 2010 led to the outbreak of the euro crisis. Particularly affected is Greece (see Greek government-debt crisis from 2010), but also other countries such as Ireland, Spain, Italy and Portugal. The weakness of the Euro against almost all global currencies caused the index to fall from 29 June 2010 to 175.31 points. In the following months, the European Stability Mechanism was developed, which provides for mutual assistance in case of emergency to avoid the bankruptcy of the Member States. By May 4, 2011, the index rose to a level of 200.20 points. With the intensification of the sovereign debt crisis in the Euro zone, the Euro Currency Index fell 24 July 2012 with 168.38 points, its lowest level since March 29, 2006. Compared to the all-time high of 29 December 2008, this represents a decrease of 19.7 percent.

Yearly trend 
The below table shows the annual high, low and closing levels of the back-calculated Euro Currency Index from 1971 until 2012.

¹ 31. December 2012

External links 
 Actual Exchange Rate 
 Historical Rate

References 

Economic growth
Macroeconomic indicators
Currency
Euro
Government debt